Emiliano Santiago Barrera (born 31 December 1981 in Argentina) is a former Argentine professional footballer and currently manager.

References

1965 births
Living people
Sportspeople from La Rioja Province, Argentina
Argentine footballers
Argentina international footballers
Argentine football managers
Club Atlético Independiente footballers
Club Atlético River Plate footballers
Boca Juniors footballers
Unión Española footballers
Club Deportivo Universidad Católica footballers
Deportivo Cali footballers
Correcaminos UAT footballers
Club León footballers
C.D. Jorge Wilstermann players
Oriente Petrolero players
Argentine Primera División players
Chilean Primera División players
Categoría Primera A players
Liga MX players
Municipal Limeño managers
Expatriate footballers in Chile
Expatriate footballers in Mexico
Expatriate footballers in Bolivia
Expatriate footballers in Colombia
Expatriate football managers in El Salvador
Argentine expatriate footballers
Argentine expatriate sportspeople in Colombia
Argentine expatriate sportspeople in Bolivia
Argentine expatriate sportspeople in Mexico
Argentine expatriate sportspeople in Chile
Association football midfielders